Crocker is an unincorporated community and census-designated place (CDP) in Clark County, South Dakota, United States. The population was 19 at the 2020 census.

Crocker was laid out in 1906.

Geography

Crocker is located in northern Clark County along South Dakota Highway 20, which leads east and southeast  to Watertown and west  to Conde.

Demographics

References

Census-designated places in Clark County, South Dakota
Census-designated places in South Dakota